Savi Sharma is an Indian novelist. She is the author of the best-selling novel Everyone Has a Story – An Inspirational Story of Dreams, Friendship, Hope, Love & Life. She is also the co-founder of the motivational media blog "Life & People" where she writes about positivity, meditation, the law of attraction, and spirituality.

After school, Sharma enrolled for a Bachelor of Commerce degree at a university in Surat and began studying Chartered Accountancy. She decided to quit her studies after being convinced about her book Everyone Has a Story. She self-published it, which went on to become a bestseller, making Sharma India's first successful female self-published author.

Books 
Everyone Has a Story (2015)
This is Not Your Story (2017)
Everyone Has a Story – 2 (2018)
Stories We Never Tell (2020)

References

External links 
 

Living people
People from Surat
English-language writers from India
Indian women novelists
21st-century Indian novelists
Novelists from Gujarat
21st-century Indian women writers
Year of birth missing (living people)